The 2002 FINA Men's Water Polo World League was the first edition of the annual event, organised by the world's governing body in aquatics, the FINA. After two preliminary rounds the Super Final was held in Patras, Greece from August 1 to August 4, 2002.

Preliminary round
From June 28 to July 28, 2002

Group A

Greece qualified for the Super Final as the host country. Only the top place earned qualification, which was taken by Spain. Three points were awarded for a win, one point for a loss.

Group B

The top two places, won by Hungary and Russia, earned qualification. Three points were awarded for a win, one point for a loss.

Super Final
From August 1 to August 4

Group stage

The top two placed teams in the round-robin advanced to the final against each other, while the two bottom placed teams played for the bronze medal. The Russia–Hungary game was declared a 0–5 loss for both teams. Three points were awarded for a win, one point for a loss.

Bronze medal match
August 4, 2002

Gold medal match
August 4, 2002

Final ranking

Individual awards

Statistics
Total goals: 1027
Total matches: 55
Goals per match: 18.7
Total of scorers: 105

References

 FINA
 Sports123

2002
W
W
International water polo competitions hosted by Greece
Sports competitions in Patras